Dwinell is a surname. Notable people with the surname include:

Frank A. Dwinell (1848–1928), American businessman and politician
Justin Dwinell (1785–1850), American lawyer and politician
Lane Dwinell (1906–1997), American politician